California elects United States senators to Class 1 and Class 3. The state has been represented by 47 people in the Senate since it was admitted to the Union on September 9, 1850. Its U.S. senators are Democrats Dianne Feinstein and Alex Padilla. Feinstein is the longest serving Senator from California.

List of senators

|- style="height:2em"
! 1
| align=left | John C. Frémont
|  | Democratic
| nowrap | Sep 9, 1850 –Mar 3, 1851
| Elected in 1849.
| 1
| 
| rowspan=4 | 1
| rowspan=4 | Elected in 1849.
| rowspan=4 nowrap | Sep 9, 1850 –Mar 2, 1855
| rowspan=4  | Democratic
| rowspan=4 align=right | William M. Gwin
! rowspan=11 | 1

|- style="height:2em"
| colspan=3 | Vacant
| nowrap | Mar 4, 1851 –Jan 29, 1852
| Legislature failed to elect.
| rowspan=5 | 2
| rowspan=2 

|- style="height:2em"
! rowspan=4 | 2
| rowspan=4 align=left | John B. Weller
| rowspan=4  | Democratic
| rowspan=4 nowrap | Jan 30, 1852 –Mar 3, 1857
| rowspan=4 | Elected late in 1852.Lost re-election.

|- style="height:2em"
| 

|- style="height:2em"
| rowspan=2 
| rowspan=7 | 2
| Legislature failed to elect.
| nowrap | Mar 3, 1855 –Jan 13, 1857
| colspan=2 | Vacant

|- style="height:2em"
| rowspan=6 | Elected late in 1857.
| rowspan=6 nowrap | Jan 14, 1857 –Mar 3, 1861
| rowspan=6  | Democratic
| rowspan=6 align=left | William M. Gwin

|- style="height:2em"
! rowspan=2 | 3
| rowspan=2 align=left | David C. Broderick
| rowspan=2  | Democratic
| rowspan=2 nowrap | Mar 4, 1857 –Sep 16, 1859
| rowspan=2 | Elected in 1856.Died.
| rowspan=6 | 3
| 

|- style="height:2em"
| rowspan=4 

|- style="height:2em"
| colspan=3 | Vacant
| nowrap | Sep 17, 1859 –Nov 2, 1859
|  

|- style="height:2em"
! 4
| align=left | Henry P. Haun
|  | Democratic
| nowrap | Nov 3, 1859 –Mar 4, 1860
| Appointed to continue Broderick's term.Lost election to finish Broderick's term.

|- style="height:2em"
! rowspan=2 | 5
| rowspan=2 align=left | Milton Latham
| rowspan=2  | Democratic
| rowspan=2 nowrap | Mar 5, 1860 –Mar 3, 1863
| rowspan=2 | Elected in 1860 to finish Broderick's term.Lost re-election.

|- style="height:2em"
| 
| rowspan=3 | 3
| rowspan=3 | Elected in 1860.Retired.
| rowspan=3 nowrap | Mar 4, 1861 –Mar 3, 1867
| rowspan=3  | Democratic
| rowspan=3 align=right | James A. McDougall
! rowspan=3 | 2

|- style="height:2em"
! rowspan=3 | 6
| rowspan=3 align=left | John Conness
| rowspan=3  | Republican
| rowspan=3 nowrap | Mar 4, 1863 –Mar 3, 1869
| rowspan=3 | Elected during the 1862/63 cycle.
| rowspan=3 | 4
| 

|- style="height:2em"
| 

|- style="height:2em"
| 
| rowspan=3 | 4
| rowspan=3 | Elected during the 1866/67 cycle.
| rowspan=3 nowrap | Mar 4, 1867 –Mar 3, 1873
| rowspan=3  | Republican
| rowspan=3 align=right | Cornelius Cole
! rowspan=3 | 3

|- style="height:2em"
! rowspan=3 | 7
| rowspan=3 align=left | Eugene Casserly
| rowspan=3  | Democratic
| rowspan=3 nowrap | Mar 4, 1869 –Nov 29, 1873
| rowspan=3 | Elected in 1868.Resigned.
| rowspan=5 | 5
| 

|- style="height:2em"
| 

|- style="height:2em"
| rowspan=3 
| rowspan=5 | 5
| rowspan=5 | Elected in 1872 or 1873.Retired.
| rowspan=5 nowrap | Mar 4, 1873 –Mar 3, 1879
| rowspan=5  | Republican
| rowspan=5 align=right | Aaron A. Sargent
! rowspan=5 | 4

|- style="height:2em"
| colspan=3 | Vacant
| nowrap | Nov 30, 1873 –Dec 22, 1873
|  

|- style="height:2em"
! 8
| align=left | John S. Hager
|  | Democratic
| nowrap | Dec 23, 1873 –Mar 3, 1875
| Elected in 1873 to finish Casserly's term.Retired.

|- style="height:2em"
! rowspan=3 | 9
| rowspan=3 align=left | Newton Booth
| rowspan=3  | Anti-Monopoly
| rowspan=3 nowrap | Mar 4, 1875 –Mar 3, 1881
| rowspan=3 | Elected early in 1873.Retired.
| rowspan=3 | 6
| 

|- style="height:2em"
| 

|- style="height:2em"
| 
| rowspan=3 | 6
| rowspan=3 | Elected in 1878.Retired.
| rowspan=3 nowrap | Mar 4, 1879 –Mar 3, 1885
| rowspan=3  | Democratic
| rowspan=3 align=right | James T. Farley
! rowspan=3 | 5

|- style="height:2em"
! rowspan=3 | 10
| rowspan=3 align=left | John Franklin Miller
| rowspan=3  | Republican
| rowspan=3 nowrap | Mar 4, 1881 –Mar 8, 1886
| rowspan=3 | Elected in 1880.Died.
| rowspan=6 | 7
| 

|- style="height:2em"
| 

|- style="height:2em"
| rowspan=4 
| rowspan=7 | 7
| rowspan=7 | Elected in 1885.
| rowspan=10 nowrap | Mar 4, 1885 –Jun 21, 1893
| rowspan=10  | Republican
| rowspan=10 align=right | Leland Stanford
! rowspan=10 | 6

|- style="height:2em"
| colspan=3 | Vacant
| nowrap | Mar 9, 1886 –Mar 22, 1886
|  

|- style="height:2em"
! 11
| align=left | George Hearst
|  | Democratic
| nowrap | Mar 23, 1886 –Aug 3, 1886
| Appointed to continue Miller's term.Successor qualified.

|- style="height:2em"
! 12
| align=left | Abram Williams
|  | Republican
| nowrap | Aug 4, 1886 –Mar 3, 1887
| Elected in 1886 to finish Miller's term.Retired.

|- style="height:2em"
! rowspan=2 | 13
| rowspan=2 align=left | George Hearst
| rowspan=2  | Democratic
| rowspan=2 nowrap | Mar 4, 1887 –Feb 28, 1891
| rowspan=2 | Elected in 1887.Died.
| rowspan=5 | 8
| 

|- style="height:2em"
| rowspan=2 

|- style="height:2em"
| rowspan=2 colspan=3 | Vacant
| rowspan=2 nowrap | Mar 1, 1891 –Mar 18, 1891
| rowspan=2 |  

|- style="height:2em"
| rowspan=2 
| rowspan=6 | 8
| rowspan=3 | Re-elected in 1891.Died.

|- style="height:2em"
! 14
| align=left | Charles N. Felton
|  | Republican
| nowrap | Mar 19, 1891 –Mar 3, 1893
| Elected in 1891 to finish Hearst's term.Retired.

|- style="height:2em"
! rowspan=5 | 15
| rowspan=5 align=left | Stephen M. White
| rowspan=5  | Democratic
| rowspan=5 nowrap | Mar 4, 1893 –Mar 3, 1899
| rowspan=5 | Elected in 1893.Retired.
| rowspan=5 | 9
| rowspan=3 

|- style="height:2em"
|  
| nowrap | Jun 22, 1893 –Jul 25, 1893
| colspan=3 | Vacant

|- style="height:2em"
| rowspan=2 | Appointed to continue Stanford's term.Elected in 1895 to finish Stanford's term.
| rowspan=12 nowrap | Jul 26, 1893 –Mar 3, 1915
| rowspan=12  | Republican
| rowspan=12 align=right | George Clement Perkins
! rowspan=12 | 7

|- style="height:2em"
| 

|- style="height:2em"
| 
| rowspan=4 | 9
| rowspan=4 | Re-elected in 1897.

|- style="height:2em"
| colspan=3 | Vacant
| nowrap | Mar 4, 1899 –Feb 6, 1900
|  
| rowspan=4 | 10
| rowspan=2 

|- style="height:2em"
! rowspan=3 | 16
| rowspan=3 align=left | Thomas R. Bard
| rowspan=3  | Republican
| rowspan=3 nowrap | Feb 7, 1900 –Mar 3, 1905
| rowspan=3 | Elected late in 1900.Lost re-election.

|- style="height:2em"
| 

|- style="height:2em"
| 
| rowspan=3 | 10
| rowspan=3 | Re-elected in 1903.

|- style="height:2em"
! rowspan=3 | 17
| rowspan=3 align=left | Frank P. Flint
| rowspan=3  | Republican
| rowspan=3 nowrap | Mar 4, 1905 –Mar 3, 1911
| rowspan=3 | Elected in 1905.Retired.
| rowspan=3 | 11
| 

|- style="height:2em"
| 

|- style="height:2em"
| 
| rowspan=3 | 11
| rowspan=3 | Re-elected in 1909.Retired.

|- style="height:2em"
! rowspan=3 | 18
| rowspan=3 align=left | John D. Works
| rowspan=3  | Republican
| rowspan=3 nowrap | Mar 4, 1911 –Mar 3, 1917
| rowspan=3 | Elected in 1911.Retired.
| rowspan=3 | 12
| 

|- style="height:2em"
| 

|- style="height:2em"
| 
| rowspan=3 | 12
| rowspan=3 | Elected in 1914.Lost re-election.
| rowspan=3 nowrap | Mar 4, 1915 –Mar 3, 1921
| rowspan=3  | Democratic
| rowspan=3 align=right | James D. Phelan
! rowspan=3 | 8

|- style="height:2em"
! rowspan=16 | 19
| rowspan=16 align=left | Hiram Johnson
| rowspan=16  | Republican
| rowspan=16 nowrap | Mar 4, 1917 –Aug 6, 1945
| rowspan=3 | Elected in 1916.Not seated until March 16 in order to remain Governor of California.
| rowspan=3 | 13
| 

|- style="height:2em"
| 

|- style="height:2em"
| 
| rowspan=3 | 13
| rowspan=3 | Elected in 1920.
| rowspan=6 nowrap | Mar 4, 1921 –Mar 3, 1933
| rowspan=6  | Republican
| rowspan=6 align=right | Samuel M. Shortridge
! rowspan=6 | 9

|- style="height:2em"
| rowspan=3 | Re-elected in 1922.
| rowspan=3 | 14
| 

|- style="height:2em"
| 

|- style="height:2em"
| 
| rowspan=3 | 14
| rowspan=3 | Re-elected in 1926.Lost renomination.

|- style="height:2em"
| rowspan=3 | Re-elected in 1928.
| rowspan=3 | 15
| 

|- style="height:2em"
| 

|- style="height:2em"
| 
| rowspan=4 | 15
| rowspan=3 | Elected in 1932.Lost renomination, then resigned.
| rowspan=3 nowrap | Mar 4, 1933 –Nov 8, 1938
| rowspan=3  | Democratic
| rowspan=3 align=right | William Gibbs McAdoo
! rowspan=3 | 10

|- style="height:2em"
| rowspan=4 | Re-elected in 1934.
| rowspan=4 | 16
| 

|- style="height:2em"
| rowspan=2 

|- style="height:2em"
| Appointed to finish McAdoo's term.Retired.
| nowrap | Nov 9, 1938 –Jan 3, 1939
|  | Democratic
| align=right | Thomas M. Storke
! 11

|- style="height:2em"
| 
| rowspan=3 | 16
| rowspan=3 | Elected in 1938.
| rowspan=8 nowrap | Jan 3, 1939 –Nov 30, 1950
| rowspan=8  | Democratic
| rowspan=8 align=right | Sheridan Downey
! rowspan=8 | 12

|- style="height:2em"
| rowspan=3 | Re-elected in 1940.Died.
| rowspan=5 | 17
| 

|- style="height:2em"
| 

|- style="height:2em"
| rowspan=3 
| rowspan=6 | 17
| rowspan=5 | Re-elected in 1944.Ran for re-election, but dropped out of renomination race due to ill health.Resigned early due to ill health.

|- style="height:2em"
| colspan=3 | Vacant
| nowrap | Aug 7, 1945 –Aug 25, 1945
|  

|- style="height:2em"
! rowspan=9 | 20
| rowspan=9 align=left | William Knowland
| rowspan=9  | Republican
| rowspan=9 nowrap | Aug 26, 1945 –Jan 3, 1959
| Appointed to continue Johnson's term.Elected in 1946 to finish Johnson's term.

|- style="height:2em"
| rowspan=5 | Re-elected to full term in 1946.
| rowspan=5 | 18
| 

|- style="height:2em"
| rowspan=2 

|- style="height:2em"
| Appointed to finish Downey's term,having been elected to the next term.
| rowspan=2 nowrap | Dec 1, 1950 –Jan 1, 1953
| rowspan=2  | Republican
| rowspan=2 align=right | Richard Nixon
! rowspan=2 | 13

|- style="height:7em"
| rowspan=2 
| rowspan=4 | 18
| Elected in 1950.Resigned to become U.S. Vice President.

|- style="height:2em"
| rowspan=3 | Appointed to continue Nixon's term.Elected in 1954 to finish Nixon's term.
| rowspan=12 nowrap | Jan 2, 1953 –Jan 3, 1969
| rowspan=12  | Republican
| rowspan=12 align=right | Thomas Kuchel
! rowspan=12 | 14

|- style="height:2em"
| rowspan=3 | Re-elected in 1952.Retired to run for Governor of California.
| rowspan=3 | 19
| 

|- style="height:2em"
| 

|- style="height:2em"
| 
| rowspan=3 | 19
| rowspan=3 | Re-elected in 1956.

|- style="height:2em"
! rowspan=3 | 21
| rowspan=3 align=left | Clair Engle
| rowspan=3  | Democratic
| rowspan=3 nowrap | Jan 3, 1959 –Jul 30, 1964
| rowspan=3 | Elected in 1958.Died.
| rowspan=6 | 20
| 

|- style="height:2em"
| 

|- style="height:2em"
| rowspan=4 
| rowspan=6 | 20
| rowspan=6 | Re-elected in 1962.Lost renomination.

|- style="height:2em"
| colspan=3 | Vacant
| nowrap | Jul 31, 1964 –Aug 3, 1964
|  

|- style="height:2em"
! 22
| align=left | Pierre Salinger
|  | Democratic
| nowrap | Aug 4, 1964 –Dec 31, 1964
| Appointed to continue Engle's term.Lost election to full term, resigned early to give successor preferential seniority.

|- style="height:2em"
! rowspan=4 | 23
| rowspan=4 align=left | George Murphy
| rowspan=4  | Republican
| rowspan=4 nowrap | Jan 1, 1965 –Jan 1, 1971
| Appointed early to finish Engle's term, having been elected to the next term.

|- style="height:2em"
| rowspan=3 | Elected in 1964.Lost re-election, resigned early to give successor preferential seniority.
| rowspan=4 | 21
| 

|- style="height:2em"
| 

|- style="height:2em"
| rowspan=2 
| rowspan=4 | 21
| rowspan=4 | Elected in 1968.
| rowspan=16 nowrap | Jan 3, 1969 –Jan 3, 1993
| rowspan=16  | Democratic
| rowspan=16 align=right | Alan Cranston
! rowspan=16 | 15

|- style="height:2em"
! rowspan=4 | 24
| rowspan=4 align=left | John V. Tunney
| rowspan=4  | Democratic
| rowspan=4 nowrap | Jan 2, 1971 –Jan 1, 1977
| Appointed to finish Murphy's term, having been elected to the next term.

|- style="height:2em"
| rowspan=3 | Elected in 1970.Lost re-election, resigned early to give successor preferential seniority.
| rowspan=4 | 22
| 

|- style="height:2em"
| 

|- style="height:2em"
| rowspan=2 
| rowspan=4 | 22
| rowspan=4 | Re-elected in 1974.

|- style="height:2em"
! rowspan=4 | 25
| rowspan=4 align=left | S. I. Hayakawa
| rowspan=4  | Republican
| rowspan=4 nowrap | Jan 2, 1977 –Jan 3, 1983
| Appointed to finish Tunney's term, having been elected to the next term.

|- style="height:2em"
| rowspan=3 | Elected in 1976.Retired.
| rowspan=3 | 23
| 

|- style="height:2em"
| 

|- style="height:2em"
| 
| rowspan=3 | 23
| rowspan=3 | Re-elected in 1980.

|- style="height:2em"
! rowspan=5 | 26
| rowspan=5 align=left | Pete Wilson
| rowspan=5  | Republican
| rowspan=5 nowrap | Jan 3, 1983 –Jan 7, 1991
| rowspan=3 | Elected in 1982.
| rowspan=3 | 24
| 

|- style="height:2em"
| 

|- style="height:2em"
| 
| rowspan=5 | 24
| rowspan=5 | Re-elected in 1986.Retired.

|- style="height:2em"
| rowspan=2 | Re-elected in 1988.Resigned to become Governor of California.
| rowspan=5 | 25
| 

|- style="height:2em"
| rowspan=3 

|- style="height:2em"
! 27
| align=left | John Seymour
|  | Republican
| nowrap | Jan 7, 1991 –Nov 3, 1992
| Appointed to continue Wilson's term.Lost election to finish Wilson's term.

|- style="height:2em"
! rowspan=18 | 28
| rowspan=18 align=left | Dianne Feinstein
| rowspan=18  | Democratic
| rowspan=18 | Nov 4, 1992 –Present
| rowspan=2 | Elected in 1992 to finish Wilson's term.

|- style="height:2em"
| 
| rowspan=3 | 25
| rowspan=3 | Elected in 1992.
| rowspan=12 | Jan 3, 1993 –Jan 3, 2017
| rowspan=12  | Democratic
| rowspan=12 align=right | Barbara Boxer
! rowspan=12 | 16

|- style="height:2em"
| rowspan=3 | Re-elected in 1994.
| rowspan=3 | 26
| 

|- style="height:2em"
| 

|- style="height:2em"
| 
| rowspan=3 | 26
| rowspan=3 | Re-elected in 1998.

|- style="height:2em"
| rowspan=3 | Re-elected in 2000.
| rowspan=3 | 27
| 

|- style="height:2em"
| 

|- style="height:2em"
| 
| rowspan=3 | 27
| rowspan=3 | Re-elected in 2004.

|- style="height:2em"
| rowspan=3 | Re-elected in 2006.
| rowspan=3 | 28
| 

|- style="height:2em"
| 

|- style="height:2em"
| 
| rowspan=3 | 28
| rowspan=3 | Re-elected in 2010.Retired.

|- style="height:2em"
| rowspan=3 | Re-elected in 2012.
| rowspan=3 | 29
| 

|- style="height:2em"
| 

|- style="height:2em"
| 
| rowspan=4 | 29
| rowspan=3 | Elected in 2016.Resigned to become U.S. Vice President.
| rowspan=3 nowrap | Jan 3, 2017 –Jan 18, 2021
| rowspan=3  | Democratic
| rowspan=3 align=right | Kamala Harris
! rowspan=3 | 17

|- style="height:2em"
| rowspan=4 | Re-elected in 2018.Retiring at the end of term.
| rowspan=4 | 30
| 

|- style="height:2em"
| rowspan=2 

|- style="height:2em"
| Appointed to continue Harris's term.Elected in 2022 to finish Harris's term.
| rowspan=4 nowrap | Jan 18, 2021 –Present
| rowspan=4  | Democratic
| rowspan=4 align=right | Alex Padilla
! rowspan=4 | 18

|- style="height:2em"
| 
| rowspan=3 | 30
| rowspan=3 | Re-elected to full term in 2022.

|- style="height:2em"
| rowspan=3 colspan=5 | To be determined in the 2024 election.
| rowspan=3 | 31
| 

|- style="height:2em"
| 

|- style="height:2em"
| 
| 31
| colspan=5 | To be determined in the 2028 election.

See also

 List of United States representatives from California
 United States congressional delegations from California
 Elections in California
 List of United States Senate elections in California

Notes

References 

 
 
 

 
United States senators
California